Omaweneno is a village in Kgalagadi District of Botswana. It is located north-east of the district capital, Tshabong. The population was 917 in 2011 census. Omaweneno is a Herero word meaning "Where people meet.

References

Kgalagadi District
Villages in Botswana